The PS20 solar power plant (PS20)  solar power plant is a solar thermal energy plant in Sanlucar la Mayor near Seville in Andalusia, Spain. It was the world's most powerful solar power tower until the Ivanpah Solar Power Facility in California became operational in 2014. The 20 megawatt (MW) solar power tower produces electricity with large movable mirrors called heliostats.

Construction of PS20 was started in 2006 and it commenced operation in 2009. It features several significant technological improvements over the earlier PS10. These include a receiver with higher efficiency, various improvements in the control and operational systems, and a better thermal energy storage system.

"PS20 consists of a solar field of 1,255 mirrored heliostats designed by Abengoa Solar.

"The remaining power plants will be built over the next few years. They will include low- and high-concentration photovoltaic, tower thermoelectric, parabolic-trough collector and Stirling dish plants. Abengoa Solar's parabolic trough plants, Solnova 1, 3 and 4, which can generate 150 MW of power, are under construction at the Solar Platform."

Resulting from cooperation between Ciemat, the IDAE, and the University of Seville, the whole plant is to be completed by 2013, when it will produce approximately 300 MW – energy for around 180,000 homes, equivalent to the needs of the city of Seville.
PS20 produces about 48,000 megawatt-hours (MW·h) per year, for which it receives €271 (US$360) per MW·h under its power purchase agreement.

See also 

List of solar thermal power stations
Renewable energy in the European Union
Solar power in Spain
Solucar

References

External links 

 
Telvent develops control system for new solar power plants in Seville
Final technical progress report, for European Union officials (November 2006)
Power station harnesses Sun's rays
Description and pictures
Power tower reflects well on sunny Spain

Solar power stations in Spain
Solar thermal energy
Energy development
Energy in Andalusia